Lyse may refer to:

 Lyse Abbey, a former Cistercian abbey in Norway
 Lyse, an alternative name of Lysebotn, Norway
 Lyse Energi, a Norwegian power company
 Łyse, Masovian Voivodeship, a village in east-central Poland
 Łyse, Podlaskie Voivodeship, a village in north-east Poland
 lyse is a verb referring to the process of lysis, the death of a cell by bursting
 Lyse (mythology), daughter of Thespius and Megamede in Greek mythology, who bore Heracles a son, Eumedes
 Lyse Doucet, Canadian journalist, presenter and correspondent for BBC World Service radio and BBC World television
 Lyse Richer, Canadian administrator and music teacher
 Lysine Exporter (LysE) Superfamily, classification of particular transport proteins
 Carl L. Lyse (1899-1986), American businessman and politician